Kenneth Earl Wilson (born January 30, 1990) is an American former professional baseball outfielder.

Career

Toronto Blue Jays
Wilson attended Sickles High School in Tampa, Florida. He committed to attend the University of Florida on a college baseball scholarship. The Toronto Blue Jays selected Wilson in the second round, with the 63rd overall selection, of the 2008 Major League Baseball draft. Wilson signed with the Blue Jays, receiving a $644,000 signing bonus, and began his professional career with the Gulf Coast Blue Jays.

In the 2011-12 offseason, they assigned Wilson to play for the Canberra Cavalry of the Australian Baseball League. In 2012, he played for the Lansing Lugnuts of the Class A Midwest League. After the 2013 season, the Blue Jays added Wilson to their 40-man roster. On March 10, 2014, he was optioned to the Double-A New Hampshire Fisher Cats. Wilson was designated for assignment on April 22, to make room on the 40-man roster for Darin Mastroianni.

Minnesota Twins
Wilson was claimed by the Minnesota Twins on April 24, 2014, and assigned to the Double-A New Britain Rock Cats.

Second stint with Blue Jays
He was designated for assignment on May 9. The Blue Jays claimed Wilson back on waivers on May 11, 2014, and assigned him to New Hampshire. He was again designated for assignment on July 5, this time to make room for Cole Gillespie.

Oakland Athletics
Wilson was claimed by the Oakland Athletics on July 7, 2014. He was designated for assignment on July 28, 2014.

Miami Marlins
Wilson signed a minor league contract with the Miami Marlins during the 2014-15 offseason.

Second stint with Athletics
On November 16, 2016, Wilson signed a minor league contract with the Oakland Athletics. He spent 2017 with both the Midland RockHounds and the Nashville Sounds, where he posted a combined .240 batting average with three home runs and 26 RBIs in 90 games between both clubs. He elected free agency on November 6, 2017.

Detroit Tigers
On December 21, 2017, Wilson signed a minor league contract with the Detroit Tigers.

Chicago Dogs
On July 7, 2018, Wilson signed with the Chicago Dogs of the American Association of Independent Professional Baseball.

Generales de Durango
On January 26, 2019, Wilson signed with the Generales de Durango of the Mexican League. He was released on May 14, 2019.

References

External links

1990 births
Living people
African-American baseball players
American expatriate baseball players in Mexico
Baseball players from Tampa, Florida
Buffalo Bisons (minor league) players
Canberra Cavalry players
Chicago Dogs players
Dunedin Blue Jays players
Erie SeaWolves players
Generales de Durango players
Gulf Coast Blue Jays players
Jacksonville Suns players
Lakeland Flying Tigers players
Lansing Lugnuts players
Mexican League baseball center fielders
Midland RockHounds players
Nashville Sounds players
New Britain Rock Cats players
New Hampshire Fisher Cats players
New Orleans Zephyrs players
Sacramento River Cats players
Salt River Rafters players
Toledo Mud Hens players
Venados de Mazatlán players
American expatriate baseball players in Australia
21st-century African-American sportspeople